Associazione Sportiva Dilettantistica Polisportiva Ciliverghe di Mazzano, commonly referred to as Ciliverghe Calcio,  is an Italian football club based in Mazzano, Lombardy. Currently it plays in Eccellenza. 
Founded in the 1979

History

Foundation
The club was founded in 1979.

Serie D
In the season 2013–14 the team was promoted for the first time, from Eccellenza Lombardy/C to Serie D. In the 2013–14 season the team was promoted for the first time, from Lombardia Excellence / C to Serie D.  The team then played in Serie D until the 2019–20 season, also going close to promotion to Serie C thanks also to the most prolific duo of that season Galuppini and Bertazzoli when they were relegated to Eccellenza, where they now play during the 2020–21 season

Colors and badge
Its colors are blue and yellow.

References

External links
  Official homepage

Football clubs in Lombardy
Association football clubs established in 1981
1981 establishments in Italy